In probability theory, the Brownian tree, or Aldous tree, or Continuum Random Tree (CRT) is a special case from random real trees which may be defined from a Brownian excursion. The Brownian tree was defined and studied by David Aldous in three articles published in 1991 and 1993. This tree has since then been generalized.

This random tree has several equivalent definitions and constructions: using sub-trees generated by finitely many leaves, using a Brownian excursion, Poisson separating a straight line or as a limit of Galton-Watson trees.

Intuitively, the Brownian tree is a binary tree whose nodes (or branching points) are dense in the tree; which is to say that for any distinct two points of the tree, there will always exist a node between them. It is a fractal object which can be approximated with computers or by physical processes with dendritic structures.

Definitions 
The following definitions are different characterisations of a Brownian tree, they are taken from Aldous's three articles. The notions of leaf, node, branch, root are the intuitive notions on a tree (for details, see real trees).

Finite-dimensional laws 
This definition gives the finite-dimensional laws of the subtrees generated by finitely many leaves.

These trees have  edges with lengths . A tree is then defined by its shape  (which is to say the order of the nodes) and the edge lengths. We define a probability law  of a random variable  on this space by:

 

where .

In other words,  depends not on the shape of the tree but rather on the total sum of all the edge lengths.

In other words, the Brownian tree is defined from the laws of all the finite sub-trees one can generate from it.

Continuous tree 
The Brownian tree is a real tree defined from a Brownian excursion (see characterisation 4 in Real tree).

Let be a Brownian excursion.

  for any 

 

 is then a distance on the quotient space . 

Poisson line-breaking construction 
This is also called stick-breaking construction.

Consider a non-homogeneous Poisson point process  with intensity . In other words, for any ,  is a Poisson variable with parameter . Then the lengths of the intervals  are exponential variables with decreasing means. We then make the following construction:

 (initialisation) The first step is to pick a random point  uniformly on the interval . We obtain a tree  with a root (the point 0), two leaves ( and ), as well as one binary branching point (the point ).

This algorithm may be used to simulate numerically Brownian trees.

Limit of Galton-Watson trees 
Consider a Galton-Watson tree whose reproduction law has finite non-zero variance, conditioned to have  nodes. In other words, each edge has length . The construction can be formalized by considering the Galton-Watson tree as a metric space or by using renormalized contour processes.

Here, the limit used is the convergence in distribution of stochastic processes in the Skorokhod space (if we consider the contour processes) or the convergence in distribution defined from the Hausdorff distance (if we consider the metric spaces).

References 

Probability and statistics
Wiener process
Fractals